Pumilio homolog 2 is an RNA-binding protein that in humans is encoded by the PUM2 gene.

Interactions
PUM2 has been shown to interact with the following proteins:
 CPEB
 DAZL
 DAZ1
 NANOS1

References

Further reading